Neutrality Act may refer to:
 Proclamation of Neutrality, 1793, declared the US neutral in the conflict between France and Great Britain
 Neutrality Act of 1794, makes it illegal for an American to wage war against any country at peace with the US
 Neutrality Acts of the 1930s, passed by Congress in the 1930s in response to turmoil in Europe and Asia